The Tbilisi International Festival of Theatre is an international theatre festival in Tbilisi, the capital of Georgia. The festival is founded by the Tbilisi Municipality through the initiative of the mayor of Tbilisi Gigi Ugulava in 2009. 

The Festival, one of the major international cultural events in Tbilisi, runs annually at the end of September and beginning of October. It has been a member of the European Festivals Association since 2011.

References

Culture in Tbilisi
Tourist attractions in Tbilisi
Festivals in Georgia (country)
Theatre in Georgia (country)
2009 establishments in Georgia (country)
Recurring events established in 2009
Annual events in Georgia (country)
Autumn events in Georgia (country)